The Plural Voices – Peoples of Macau is one of 16 political parties that ran in the September 2009 legislative election in Macau, China. It was the first time the party had contested in an election. The party fielded 12 candidates in the election, the maximum allowed by law. The candidates are from different ethnic backgrounds including Macanese, Portuguese, and, for the first time ever, one Filipino. The party has stressed the need for massive investments in education, health and the administration of justice, as well as the protection of the cultural heritage of Macau.

Casimiro Pinto, a 38-year-old Chinese and Portuguese interpreter and translator in the public administration was the first candidate of "Voz Plural - Gentes de Macau". Jorge Godinho and Jenny Oliveros Lao, both university professors, were the second and third. The other members on the list were respectively Paula Carion, Mario Evora, Isabela Manhao, Rodantes Quejano, Pedro Lobo, Sharoz Pernencar, Guiomar Pedruco, Chiang Tai Chi and Herman Comandante.

External links 
 Official website

Political parties in Macau